Yago or YAGO may refer to:

People

Given name
 Yago (footballer, born 1997), Brazilian footballer Yago César da Silva
 Yago (footballer, born 1992), Brazilian footballer Yago Fernando da Silva
 Yago Del Piero (born 1994), Brazilian football
 Yago Felipe (born 1994), Brazilian football midfielder
 Yago Fernández (born 1988), Portuguese footballer
 Yago Gomes (born 2001), Brazilian footballer
 Yago González (born 1979), Spanish footballer
 Yago Iglesias (born 1982), Spanish football manager
 Yago Lamela (1977–2014), Spanish long jumper
 Yago Lange (born 1988), Argentine racing sailor
 Yago (footballer, born 1994), Brazilian footballer Yago Moreira Silva
 Yago Pikachu (born 1992),  Brazilian footballer
 Yago (footballer, born 1995), Brazilian footballer Yago Henrique Severino dos Santos
 Yago Yao (born 1979), Equatoguinean former footballer

Surname
Bernard Yago (1916–1997), Côte d'Ivoire Cardinal and Archbishop of Abidjan
Gideon Yago (born 1978),  writer and former correspondent for MTV News and CBS News
Steeve Yago (born 1992), French-born Burkinabé footballer who plays as a defender for Toulouse
Takanori Yago (born 1994), Japanese sumo wrestler

Other uses 
Yagō, a term applied in traditional Japanese culture to names passed down within a guild, studio, or other circumstance other than blood relations
YAGO (database), a semantic knowledge base
Yago (telenovela), a Mexican telenovela from Televisa
Yago, a character from the Summoner video game series

See also 
 Iago (disambiguation)
 Jago (disambiguation)